Hubertus Wijnandus Jozef Marie (Huub) Stapel (born 2 December 1954, in Tegelen) is a Dutch actor. He is especially known from the films De Lift (1983), Flodder (1986) and Amsterdamned (1988) by Dick Maas. He also appeared in the Golden Earring video When the Lady Smiles.

Filmografie

Dutch productions 

Ferry (2021)
Redbad (2018)
Zwarte Tulp (2015) - Luuk Vonk
Goedenavond dames en heren (2015) - Benno
Hemel op aarde (2013) - Father Sef Janzen
A Perfect Man (2013) - Pieter
Moeder, ik wil bij de Revue (2012) - Jacob Somers
Bellicher:Cel (2012) - Steiner
De Goede Dood (2012) - Michael
Hard tegen Hard (2011) - Ben Berendsen
U & Eye (2011) - Carpenter 
Titten (2011)
Sint (2010) - Saint Nicholas
Iep! (2010) - Warre
Terug naar de kust (2009)- Victor
Het Wapen van Geldrop (2008) - Piet Veerman
Alles is Liefde (2007) - himself
Flikken Maastricht television series - Geert Veldkamp (Afl., Kogelvis, 2007)
SEXtet (2007) - Bram
Oberon television series - C (2005)
Johan (2005) - Rinus Dros
The Preacher (film) (De Dominee) (2004) - Anton Donkers
Klem in de draaideur (2003) - Dato Steenhuis
Verder dan de maan (2003) - Mees Werner sr.
Godforsaken (Van God Los) (2003) - Herbert Meijer
De vloer op television series - several parts (sinds 2002)
'n Stukje humor (2002) - Gerard
Het achterland (television film, 2001) - Alex
De Nacht van Aalbers (television film, 2001) - unknown
Loenatik televisieserie - Automonteur (Afl., De milieuactie, 2001)
Dial 9 for Love (2001) - Pieter
Wet & Waan television series - Herman Vlieger (10 episodes in season 1, 2000 & 10 episodes in season 2, 2003)
Oh oh Den Haag television series - Wim van Tol (2000)
Rent a Friend (2000) - Mr. Bloedworst
Retour Den Haag (television film, 1999) - Ed. van Thijn
Flodder television series - Paolo (Afl., Egotrip, 1998)
Mortinho por chegar a casa (1996) - Joris
De Zeemeerman (1996) - Timo Babel
Walhalla (1995) - Raymond de Feyter
De Partizanen (Mini series, 1995) - Hendrik
Hoffman's honger (1993) - Baruch Spinoza
Oog in oog television series - Peter Gubbels (Afl. onbekend, 1992)
Flodder in Amerika! (1992) - Johnnie Flodder
Sjans television series - Sjaak Massini (1992-1993)
Oh Boy! (1991) - Boy in sports café
De onfatsoenlijke vrouw (1991) - Leon
Amsterdamned (1988) - Eric Visser
Het Twentsch Paradijs (television film, 1988)
Flodder (1986) - Johnnie Flodder
Op hoop van zegen (1986) - Geert
Maria (1986) - Paolo Pietrosanti
De Dream (1985) - Inspector of police
De Schorpioen (1984) - Standard-bearer
De Lift (1983) - Felix Adelaar
De Zwarte Ruiter (1983) - Floor
De Weg (television series 1983) - Jan Nieuwenhuis 
Willem van Oranje (mini series, 1983), remake of the 1934 film Willem van Oranje (film) - François-Hercule de Valois
Van de koele meren des doods (1982) - Herman
Het meisje met het rode haar (1981) - NSB member

German productions 
 (2010) - Harry Mac
Mein Herz in Chile (TV film, 2008) - Herbert Hansen
Alarm für Cobra 11 - Die Autobahnpolizei (TV series, episode: Auf eigene Faust, 2008) - Sander Kalvus
Donna Roma (TV series, 4 episodes, 2007) - Konstantin
Verrückt nach Clara (TV series, 7 episodes, 2007) - Bernd
Unter Verdacht (TV series, episode: Ein neues Leben, 2006) - Stewens
M.E.T.R.O. – Ein Team auf Leben und Tod (TV series, episode: Krim-Kongo, 2006) - Magnus van Royen
SOKO Kitzbühel (TV series, episode: Magischer Mord, 2006) - Henrik van Huisen
Sperling (TV series, episode: Sperling und der Fall Wachutka, 2005) - Johan Kerkman
Das beste Jahr meines Lebens (TV film, 2005) - Niklas Vandenberg
The Other Woman (TV film, 2004) - Henk
Das Duo (TV series, episode: Im falschen Leben, 2002) - Helmut Felser
Auf Herz und Nieren (2001) - Nemeth
Auf schmalem Grat (TV film, 2000) - Joachim Behrens
 (1999) - Bank manager
Tatort (TV series, episode: Offene Rechnung, 1999) - Uli Lischka
Ein starkes Team (TV series, episode: Braunauge, 1999) - Milan Petkowicz
Die Neue – Eine Frau mit Kaliber (TV series, episode: Stille Nacht, tödliche Nacht, 1998) - Vandeberg
Hauptsache Leben (TV film, 1998) - Dominik
Kai Rabe gegen die Vatikankiller (1998) - Karl Bresser
Widows – Erst die Ehe, dann das Vergnügen (1998) - Konrad Sommer
Eine ungehorsame Frau (TV film, 1998) - David
Knockin' on Heaven's Door (1997) - Frankie 'Boy' Beluga
Der Schutzengel (TV film, 1997) - Peter Becker
Stockinger (TV series, episode: Undschuldslämmer, 1996) - Dr. Paolo van Voorst
Zockexpress (1991) - Dany
In the Shadow of the Sandcastle (1990) - unknown
Die Kurve kriegen (1985) - Jan

Flemish productions 
Oh no! It's a woman. (2010, film)
Windkracht 10 (serie, 1997-1998) - Sergeant Dirk de Groot (diver in first series)

French production 
Vertige pour un tueur (1970) - unknown

US production 
The Attic: The Hiding of Anne Frank (television film, 1988) - Jan Gies

Theatre 
Napoleon on St. Helena - Napoleon Bonaparte
Harold & Maude
Vrijen [stichting D.R.A.M.]
Onder het Melkwoud [stichting D.R.A.M]
Moordspel [with Ton Lensink]
Democraten (as Willy Brandt)
Eten met vrienden (for this part he was nominated for a Louis d'Or)
Mephisto
Kentering van een huwelijk
Art [with Victor Löw & Sjoerd Pleijsier]
Mannen komen van Mars, Vrouwen van Venus
De Kus (2010) (with Carine Crutzen)

Television programmes
Stapel op auto's
Stapel in de States
Oberon (reality series by TROS & Eén) as the counselor
Stapel op Werk (for Limburgish television)
Het gesprek, S.T.A.P.E.L (2007)
De vloer op (2005)
Nina Nazarova aan de top! (2010)

External links 
 
 Huub Stapel at the New York Times Movies & TV

1954 births
Living people
Dutch male film actors
Dutch male stage actors
Dutch male television actors
Dutch republicans
People from Tegelen